Snehithara Saval is a 1981 Indian Kannada film, directed by K. S. R. Das and produced by A. R. Raju. The film stars Vishnuvardhan, Ambareesh, Manjula and K. S. Ashwath in the lead roles. The film has musical score by Chellapilla Satyam.

Cast

Vishnuvardhan
Ambareesh
Manjula
K. S. Ashwath
Prabhakar
Dinesh
Musuri Krishnamurthy
Dheerendra Gopal
Shakti Prasad
Chethan Ramarao
Surendar
Dr. Sridhar
Thipatur Siddaramaiah
Shivaraj
Kunigal Ramanath
K. Vijaya
M. Leelavathi
Halam
Jayamalini
Sumangali
Master Suresh
Master Anil
Pandari Bai in guest appearance
B. Jayashree in guest appearance
Joe Simon in guest appearance
Kunigal Nagabhushan in guest appearance

References

External links
 
 

1981 films
1980s Kannada-language films
Films directed by K. S. R. Das
Films scored by Satyam (composer)